Prasanna may refer to:

People

As sole name
 Prasanna (actor) (Prasanna Venkatesan, active from 2001), Indian film actor
 Prasanna (theatre director) (born 1951), Indian theatre director and playwright
 V. V. Prasanna, a Tamil  playback singer

As family name
 E. A. S. Prasanna (born 1940), Indian international cricketer
 Nivas K. Prasanna (born 1981), Indian film music composer
 R. Prasanna (born 1970), Indian musician from the Carnatic tradition
 Raghunath Prasanna (born 191399), classical Indian musician 
 Rajendra Prasanna (born 1956), classical Indian musician
 Ramaswamy Prasanna (born 1982), Indian cricketer
 Rishab Prasanna (born 1985), classical Indian musician
 Seekkuge Prasanna (born 1985), Sri Lankan international cricketer

As given name
 Prasanna Alahakoon (born before 1987), Sri Lankan naval officer
 Prasanna Amarasekara (born 1981), Sri Lankan track and field athlete
 Prasanna Acharya (born 1949), Indian politician
 Prasanna Gunasena (active from 2010), Sri Lankan neurosurgeon
 Prasanna Gunawardena (active 2015), Sri Lankan politician
 Prasanna Jayawardene (born 1979), Sri Lankan international cricketer
 K. B. Prasanna Kumar (born 1968), Indian politician
 Gouri Prasanna Majumdar (192486), Indian lyricist for Bengali films
 Prasanna Pandian (born 1984), Indian artist, architect and animator
 Prasanna Kumar Patasani (born 1946), Indian lawyer, philosopher, poet and politician
 Debi Prasanna Pattanayak (born 1931), Indian academic, linguist, social scientist and author
 Prasanna Ranatunga (active 200915), Sri Lankan politician
 Prasanna Ranaweera (active from 2015), Sri Lankan politician
 Prasanna Kumar Roy (AKA Dr. P. K. Ray, 18491932), Indian educationist
 Prasanna Shamal Senarath (born before 1991), Sri Lankan politician
 Prasanna Kumar Tagore (180186), Indian lawyer, organiser and educator
 Prasanna Vithanage (born 1962), Sri Lankan filmmaker
 Eric Prasanna Weerawardena (born 1983), Sri Lankan politician
 Prasanna Wickramasuriya (active 198198), Sri Lankan soldier

Places and buildings 
 Prasanna Venkatachalapathi Temple, Thuraiyur, a Hindu temple in Tiruchirappalli district, India
 Prasanna Venkatachalapathy Temple, a Hindu temple near Trichy in the Indian state of Tamil Nadu
 Prasanna Venkatesa Perumal Temple, Saidapet, a Hindu temple in the Indian state of Tamil Nadu
 Prasanna Venkatesa Perumal Temple, Thanjavur, a Hindu temple in the Indian state of Tamil Nadu
 Prasanna Venkateswara Puram, a village in Chittoor District, Andhra Pradesh, India
 Prasanna Yoga Anjaneyar Temple, a Hindu temple in Chennai, India

Other uses 
 Prasanna (film), a 1950 Indian film in Malayalam
 Sree Lakshmi Prasanna Pictures, an Indian film production company established in 1982

See also 
 

Surnames of Indian origin
Indian unisex given names
Sinhalese masculine given names
Sinhalese surnames